Les is a municipality in the comarca of the Aran Valley in Catalonia, Spain, close to the French border. The mayor is Andreu Cortés Labrid (UA).

References

External links
 Government data pages 

Municipalities in Val d'Aran